William J. Husted (October 11, 1866 – May 17, 1941) was a pitcher in Major League Baseball who played for the Philadelphia Athletics of the Players' League during the  season. He was born in Gloucester City, New Jersey. Batting side and throwing arm are unknown.
 
In one season career, Husted posted a 5–10 record with a 4.88 earned run average in 18 appearances, including 12 complete games, giving up 105 runs (70 earned) on 148 hits and 67 walks while striking out 33 in 129.0 innings of work.
 
Husted died in his native Gloucester at the age of 74.

See also
1890 Philadelphia Athletics (PL) season

External links

Retrosheet

1866 births
1941 deaths
Philadelphia Athletics (PL) players
19th-century baseball players
Major League Baseball pitchers
Baseball players from New Jersey
Buffalo Bisons (minor league) players
London Tecumsehs (baseball) players
Kansas City Blues (baseball) players
People from Gloucester City, New Jersey
Sportspeople from Camden County, New Jersey